WIKY may refer to:

 WIKY-FM, a radio station (104.1 FM) licensed to Evansville, Indiana, United States
 WIKY-LP, a defunct low-power television station (channel 5) licensed to Evansville, Indiana